John Jack Pitney, Jr. (born June 18, 1955) is an American political scientist. He is the Roy P. Crocker Professor of Politics at Claremont McKenna College.

Early life and education
Pitney was born in 1955, the son of a milkman and a homemaker. He grew up on the west side of Saratoga Springs, New York, where his grandfather told him stories of local political corruption and he volunteered for Richard Nixon's 1968 presidential campaign. He attended Union College, graduating in 1977 as co-valedictorian. He received his doctorate in political science from Yale University in 1985; his dissertation focused on government handling of toxic waste.

Career
From 1978 to 1984, Pitney worked as a legislative assistant for three Republicans: New York state senator John R. Dunne, Alfonse D'Amato, and future vice president Dick Cheney (then ).

In 1984, he joined the U.S. House Republican Research Committee as a senior domestic policy analyst. In 1986, he joined the faculty of the government department at Claremont McKenna College (CMC). From 1989 to 1991, he took a leave to serve as the deputy director and then acting director of the Republican National Committee's research department.

Pitney is a frequently quoted and interviewed in the political media.

He is also an expert on the politics of autism and wrote a book on the subject.

Pitney was a loud critic of former president Donald Trump and renounced his membership in the Republican Party the night he was elected.

Books

Personal life
Pitney is married and has two children. His wife works for Disney.

References

External links

Claremont McKenna College faculty page

American political scientists
Union College (New York) alumni
Yale University alumni
Claremont McKenna College faculty
Living people
1955 births